Andrew Jackson Zilker (1858–1934) was a political figure and philanthropist in Austin, Texas, after whom Zilker Park was named. He was the last private owner of Barton Springs.

Biography
Andrew Zilker was born in New Albany, Indiana. In his youth he'd read Henderson King Yoakum's two-volume History of Texas, and was inspired to head for its capital to make his fortune. In 1876, at the age of 18, he arrived in Austin with fifty cents in his pocket, immediately acquired work as a dishwasher, and doubled his money by shift's end. His next job would be on the construction of the Congress Avenue Bridge. But the real money to be made in the Texas heat, he discovered, was in the manufacture of ice, and he quickly climbed the ladder from new hire to foreman for one icemaker in a matter of months. He was quick to learn the value of business connections, joining Austin Lodge #201 of the Benevolent and Protective Order of Elks shortly after its founding in 1891.

Soon he owned an ice plant of his own outright, and in 1901 began buying land between the Colorado River and Barton Creek. He had soon acquired 350 acres (1.4 km²) surrounding Barton Springs, including the Springs themselves from John Rabb, and used the land to pasture the horses and mules that pulled his ice wagons, and the clear, clean Barton Springs water to make the ice itself. There he also built a small concrete pool and amphitheater for members of his Elks Club organization at the site of one of the three springs.

Zilker also found the time to be a volunteer fireman, Director of the First National Bank, Water and Light Commissioner, and served both as alderman from the old Tenth Ward and president of the Travis County School Board. He would own a variety of businesses, including a brickyard (perhaps to spite his rival neighbor, and brickmaker, Michael Butler), a wood and coal concern, and the water supply systems in Llano and Taylor. He even became the first Coca-Cola bottler in Austin.

The year was 1917 when, in his role as head of the school board, he cut a curious deal giving Barton Springs, and, over the next seventeen years, the surrounding acres, to the Public Free Schools of Austin (i.e. the school district) to sell to the city, which in turn paid for a $100,000 school endowment with the proceeds. This trust fund still pays for what is known today as the school-to-work program. In 1950, nearly two decades after Zilker's death, the district opened Zilker Elementary in his honor. The area itself, of course, became Zilker Metropolitan Park.

He is also remembered for his disdain for Austin mayor A. P. Wooldridge, and for encouraging Tom Miller to enter municipal politics and run for mayor in 1933. Nicknamed "the Colonel", Zilker's contribution to Austin was quite substantial.

References

American philanthropists
People from Austin, Texas
1934 deaths
1858 births
School board members in Texas
People from New Albany, Indiana